Olympus Has Fallen is a 2013 American action thriller film directed and co-produced by Antoine Fuqua from a screenplay written by Creighton Rothenberger and Katrin Benedikt, and is the first installment in the Has Fallen film series. The film stars Gerard Butler (who also co-produced), Aaron Eckhart, and Morgan Freeman with Angela Bassett, Robert Forster, Cole Hauser, Ashley Judd, Melissa Leo, Dylan McDermott, Radha Mitchell, and Rick Yune in supporting roles. The plot depicts a North Korean-led guerrilla assault on the White House, and focuses on disgraced Secret Service agent Mike Banning's efforts to rescue U.S. President Benjamin Asher.

The film was released in the United States on March 22, 2013, by FilmDistrict, and grossed $170 million against a $70 million production budget. The film received mixed reviews from critics, who praised Fuqua's direction and Butler's performance, but criticized the overt violence and screenplay. Olympus Has Fallen was one of two films released in 2013 that depicted a terrorist attack against the White House; the other was White House Down.

A sequel, titled London Has Fallen, was released on March 4, 2016, with the principal cast members reprising their roles, and a third film, Angel Has Fallen, was released on August 23, 2019.

Plot
Former U.S. Army Ranger, Mike Banning, is a Secret Service Agent and detail leader in the Presidential Protection Division, maintaining a personal, friendly relationship with President Benjamin Asher, First Lady Margaret, and their son Connor. On a snowy Christmas drive from Camp David to a campaign fundraiser, the Presidential Limo transporting the First Family spins out of control on an icy bridge. Banning pulls Asher from the vehicle, but Margaret falls to her death.

Eighteen months later, Banning works at the Treasury Department, having been removed from the presidential detail. During Asher's meeting with South Korean Prime Minister Lee Tae-Woo at the White House, the Koreans for United Freedom (KUF), a North Korean terrorist group led by Kang Yeonsak, mounts an air attack (with a USAF AC-130 gunship) and a large group of ground assault mercenaries to capture the building and kill most of the White House defense force. Aided by rogue members of the prime minister's own security detail, including ex-Secret Service Agent-turned-private security contractor Dave Forbes, they hold Asher and several top officials hostage in the PEOC, executing Lee on live video. Before being killed, Agent Roma alerts Secret Service Director Lynne Jacobs that "Olympus has fallen." Banning joins the White House's defenders during KUF's initial assault. He falls back into the White House, disabling internal surveillance and using Asher's satellite earphone to contact Jacobs and Speaker of the House Allan Trumbull, now acting president, in the Pentagon's emergency briefing room, who authorize him to proceed.

Kang uses Asher's hostage status to force Trumbull to withdraw the Seventh Fleet and the U.S. Forces from the Korean Peninsula, removing American opposition to a second Korean War. He seeks to detonate the American nuclear arsenal to turn North America into an irradiated wasteland, as revenge for the death of his parents. To do this, he needs the access codes to the Cerberus system, held only by Asher, Secretary of Defense Ruth McMillan, and Chairman of the Joint Chiefs Admiral Joseph Hoenig, all of whom are inside the PEOC. Asher orders McMillan and Hoenig to reveal their codes to save their lives, certain that he will not give up his own code.

After finding Connor hiding in the building's walls and sneaking him to safety, preventing Kang from using him to force Asher to reveal his Cerberus code, Banning kills several of the commandos, including Forbes. Army Chief of Staff General Edward Clegg convinces Trumbull to order an aerial U.S. Navy SEAL assault on the White House. The KUF discovers and decimates the assault force using the advanced Hydra 6 anti-aircraft system. Kang retaliates by executing Vice President Charlie Rodriguez.

Banning disables Kang's communications and provokes him into bringing several of his men into the open, killing them when they attempt to execute McMillan in front of the media and before they can retreat back to the bunker. With the KUF dwindling, Kang fakes his and Asher's death by sacrificing several of his commandos and the remaining hostages in a helicopter explosion; Banning sees through the ruse. With two codes already in hand, Kang eventually cracks Asher's code using a brute-force attack and activates Cerberus. Banning ambushes and kills Kang's remaining men when they attempt to escape with Asher. In the ensuing fight, Asher is shot, but Banning eventually stabs Kang in the head, killing him. Informed by Asher about Cerberus, Banning deactivates it just in time with the assistance of Trumbull and his staff.

Banning escorts Asher out of the White House to receive medical attention. Afterwards, Banning is reinstated to the head of the president's security detail as Asher speaks about the aftermath of the attack, assuring that America will prevail.

Cast
 Gerard Butler as Mike Banning, Secret Service agent and former Army Ranger
 Aaron Eckhart as Benjamin Asher, President of the United States
 Morgan Freeman as Allan Trumbull, Speaker of the House
 Rick Yune as Kang Yeonsak, a North Korean ultra-nationalist mastermind disguised as a South Korean ministerial aide
 Angela Bassett as Lynne Jacobs, Director of the U.S. Secret Service 
 Robert Forster as General Edward Clegg, Chief of Staff of the United States Army
 Cole Hauser as Agent Roma, United States Secret Service agent in charge
 Finley Jacobsen as Connor Asher, son of Benjamin and Margaret Asher
 Ashley Judd as Margaret Asher, First Lady of the United States
 Melissa Leo as Ruth McMillan, Secretary of Defense
 Dylan McDermott as Dave Forbes, former United States Secret Service agent now working for the Prime Minister of South Korea's security detail.
 Radha Mitchell as Leah Banning, a nurse and Mike's wife
 Sean O'Bryan as Ray Monroe, Deputy Director of the National Security Agency
 Lance Broadway as Agent O'Neil, member of the president's Secret Service security detail
 Tory Kittles as Agent Jones, member of the president's Secret Service security detail
 Keong Sim as Lee Tae-Woo, Prime Minister of South Korea
 Phil Austin as Charlie Rodriguez, Vice President of the United States
 James Ingersoll as Admiral Joe Hoenig, Chairman of the Joint Chiefs of Staff
 Freddy Bosche as Mark Diaz, United States Secret Service agent
 Kevin Moon as Cho, Kang's henchman
 Malana Lea as Lim, Kang's henchwoman and technical expert
 Sam Medina as Yu, Kang's henchman
In addition, the MSNBC news anchor Lawrence O'Donnell appears, uncredited, as an unnamed news anchor reporting on the developments in Washington, D.C.

Production
Olympus Has Fallen was directed by Antoine Fuqua, based on a script by Creighton Rothenberger and Katrin Benedikt in their first screenwriting effort. The production company Millennium Films acquired the spec script in March 2012, and Gerard Butler was cast later in the month as the star of the film. The rest of the characters were cast throughout June and July.

In 2012, Millennium Films competed against Sony Pictures, which was producing White House Down (a twin film about a takeover of the White House) to complete casting and begin filming.

Filming began in Shreveport, Louisiana, in mid-July 2012. Because Olympus Has Fallen was filmed so far from its actual setting of Washington, D.C., the entire production relied heavily upon visual effects, particularly computer-generated imagery. For example, computers were used to create nearly all of the opening sequence in which the First Lady is killed in a car accident, with chroma key greenscreen technology used to composite the actors into the computer-generated snowy scenery. For scenes where actors walked in or out of the White House, a first-floor façade and entrance were built; computers added the second floor, roof, and downtown D.C. cityscape. Action scenes with the White House in the background were filmed in open fields and the White House and D.C. were added in post-production.

Score
The score was composed by Trevor Morris whose past projects included The Tudors and The Borgias. The score was recorded at Trevor Morris Studios in Santa Monica with the Bratislava Slovak National Orchestra.

The record was released on March 15, 2013 via Relativity Music Group label.

Release
FilmDistrict distributed the film.

The film's trailer was criticized for using the Emergency Alert System, and several cable companies were fined by the Federal Communications Commission for airing the ad.

Home media
The film was released to home video in the United States on DVD and Blu-ray formats on August 13, 2013. It earned $38.2 million in video rental sales in the U.S.

Controversies

Authorship dispute
A lawsuit was filed in 2013 by John S. Green against Rothenberger alleging Green was the source of the film's characters and material. Rothenberger countersued, seeking a declaration that he was sole author. The case was eventually settled for $175,000, with Rothenberger retaining the rights to the film.

Butler lawsuit
In July 2021, star/producer Gerard Butler sued Nu Image/Millennium Films for $10 million, claiming that the company had understated the film's domestic gross by $17.5 million, as well as failed to report $8 million that went to its own executives. Butler's contract had entitled him to 10% of net profits.

Reception

Box office
Olympus Has Fallen grossed $98.9 million in the U.S. and Canada, and $71.3 million in other territories, for a worldwide total of $170.2 million, against a budget of $70 million.

In its first weekend the film grossed $30.5 million, finishing second at the box office and exceeded predictions of $23 million.

Critical response
Review aggregator website Rotten Tomatoes reports the film has an approval rating of 50% based on 200 reviews, and an average rating of 5.40/10. The site's critical consensus reads, "It's far from original, but Olympus Has Fallen benefits from Antoine Fuqua's tense direction and a strong performance from Gerard Butler—which might be just enough for action junkies." Metacritic assigns the film a weighted average score of 41 out of 100 based on 30 critics, indicating "mixed or average reviews". Audiences polled by CinemaScore gave the film a grade of "A−" on an A+ to F scale.

Katey Rich of CinemaBlend praised the "lean low-budget approach", and called the film "both captivating and queasy". Richard Roeper gave the film a C, calling it "just too much of a pale Die Hard ripoff". David Edelstein was more negative; while praising Butler's role as a "solid" character, he criticized the script and the violence, writing "Olympus Has Fallen is a disgusting piece of work, but it certainly hits its marks—it makes you sick with suspense".

Sequel
Gerard Butler, Morgan Freeman, Aaron Eckhart, Angela Bassett and Radha Mitchell returned for a sequel titled London Has Fallen revolving around a major terrorist strike on London during the funeral of the British Prime Minister. Production was scheduled to begin in May 2014 in London, with Creighton Rothenberger and Katrin Benedikt returning to write the script. Director Antoine Fuqua did not return, due to his commitments to The Equalizer.

On May 1, 2014, it was announced that Focus Features had acquired distribution rights to the sequel and would release it on October 2, 2015, though this was later pushed back to January 22, 2016. However, the film's release was delayed to March 4, 2016. On August 18, 2014, it was announced that Fredrik Bond would direct, but he left the film on September 18, just six weeks before shooting was set to begin. On September 28, it was announced that Babak Najafi would direct.

On October 10, 2014, it was announced that Jackie Earle Haley would join the cast. Filming for the sequel began on October 24, 2014. The film was released on March 4, 2016.

See also
 Transfer of Power (1999)
 The Lions of Lucerne (2002)
 Air Force One (1997)
 White House Down (2013)

References

External links

 
 
 
 

2013 action thriller films
2013 films
2010s action thriller films
American action thriller films
American political thriller films
Drone films
Guerrilla warfare in film
2010s English-language films
FilmDistrict films
Films about fictional presidents of the United States
Films about hostage takings
Films about nuclear war and weapons
Films about terrorism in the United States
Films about the United States Secret Service
Films about United States Army Special Forces
Films about United States Navy SEALs
Films directed by Antoine Fuqua
Films produced by Antoine Fuqua
Films set in Frederick County, Maryland
Films set in North Korea
Films set in South Korea
Films set in the White House
Films set in Washington, D.C.
Films set in Virginia
Films shot in Louisiana
Has Fallen
Techno-thriller films
United States presidential succession in fiction
2010s American films
Films set in bunkers
Works about North Korea